The Vordenstein domain is a park in the Belgian municipality of Schoten, northeast of Antwerp. It separated from the adjacent Peerdsbos forest by the E19 highway to the North.

History 

The Vordenstein domain was created in the 14th century out of the Hof ter Katen and the Hof van de Werve. At that time, the domain had a mainly agrarian function, with the feudal lord leasing patches of the land to various farmers. Starting in the 18th century, the domain gradually evolved into a recreational estate with a castle and an extensive pleasure garden, owned by a succession of wealthy families from Antwerp as a countryside retreat. In 1980 the majority of the park was eventually bought by the Belgian state, and subsequently opened to the public. A smaller part in the middle of the domain remains privately owned by the De Pret family that inherited the domain at the beginning of the 20th century.

Layout 

The majority of the present day layout stems from the 18th and 19th centuries. The oldest part of the park, the so-called Sterrenbos in the northeastern corner, was laid out in a baroque and geometrical fashion, inspired by the French gardens of Versailles. At the end of the 18th century, a forest in romantic style was planted in the middle of the park. The southwestern part of the domain was laid out in 1850 as an English landscape garden, with a pond, patches of trees and exotic plants. In the southeast lies the vegetable garden and the orangerie, which was built in the early 19th century, and is now used as a cafe. The forests in the northwest and the east were only planted at the end of the 19th century on what had been land used for farming.

References 

Parks in Belgium
Geography of Antwerp
Schoten